The 249th Battalion, CEF, was a unit in the Canadian Expeditionary Force during the First World War.  Based in Regina, Saskatchewan, the unit began recruiting in the autumn of 1916 throughout the province of Saskatchewan.  After sailing to England in March 1918 (on board ) the battalion was absorbed into the 15th Reserve Battalion, CEF, upon arrival.  The 249th Battalion had one officer commanding: Lieutenant-Colonel C. B. Keenlyside.

References

Battalions of the Canadian Expeditionary Force